Cazzola may refer to:

Cooking
 Cassoeula (Italianized  cazzuola or cazzola), typical winter dish popular in Northern Italy, mostly in Lombardy

Organisations
 Lanificio Cazzola, textile company

Places
 Cazzola, Italy, subdivision of the municipality of Traversetolo, in the province of Parma, Italy
 Monte Cazzola, mount located in Piedmont, Italy

People
 Alfredo Cazzola, businessman
 Clementina Cazzola, theater actress
 Fabio Cazzola, footballer
 Gabriele Cazzola, director and television writer
 Giuliano Cazzola, economist and politician
 Paola Cazzola, motorcyclist
 Pier Giorgio Cazzola, sprinter
 Pietro Cazzola, businessman
 Umberto Cazzola, footballer 
 Riccardo Cazzola, footballer

Surname 
 Cazzola, Italian family name